Last Energy is an American commercial developer of nuclear power plants, established in 2020 by Bret Kugelmass, who is also the founder of the Energy Impact Center, an American research institute.

The company provides full-cycle nuclear project development, including small modular reactor (SMR) design, construction, financing, service and decommissioning. The company’s power plant includes a pressurized water reactor and modular plant design. Each plant is designed to produce 20 megawatts of electricity with combined heat and power applications. Last Energy’s goal is to decarbonize energy production and increase access to clean, affordable power. The company has European subsidiaries in Romania, Poland and the UK.

History
In 2017, Bret Kugelmass began conducting interviews as Managing Director of the Energy Impact Center with experts in nuclear energy and related fields for a podcast called Titans of Nuclear. The podcast debuted in January 2018. Kugelmass and other members of the EIC team have conducted over 300 interviews for the podcast as of August 2022, and have visited over 100 nuclear sites to compile research about the feasibility of nuclear power expansion. In 2019, the center introduced the Nuclear Energy Grand Challenge, a prize competition that asked university students to develop business proposals for mitigating the cost, duration, and risks of power plant construction and maintenance.

In February 2020, the EIC introduced OPEN100, an open-source platform that aims to ease the design and construction process of nuclear power plants by providing freely-available blueprints. Its stated goal is to reduce the cost and duration of nuclear reactor construction and increase the nuclear power supply 100-fold by 2040 to aid in the decarbonization of the global economy.

Last Energy was founded in Washington, D.C. by Kugelmass in 2020. It is a commercial developer, spun-off from the Energy Impact Center and OPEN100. The company designs, manufactures and commercializes nuclear power plants, using a small modular reactor that produces 20MWe. Last Energy received $3 million in seed funding led by First Round Capital in 2020. The funding round was led by Gigafund and First Round Capital.

In March 2022, Romanian Prime Minister Nicolae Ciucă announced Last Energy would conduct a demonstrator project in Romania with the Autonomous Directorate of Nuclear Energy Technologies (RATEN) in Mioveni. Ciucă also announced the possibility to scale the deployment of Last Energy’s small modular reactor technology to contribute to Romania’s energy independence goal. This was announced in the wake of Russia invading Ukraine, which caused an energy crisis in Europe.   In June, Last Energy signed an agreement with Enea Group, the fourth largest energy group in Poland. The agreement outlined the joint pursuit of the development of Last Energy’s 20MWe small modular reactors in Poland, aiming to expand the country’s access to clean power and to achieve carbon neutrality in Poland by 2050. The agreement was signed at a public ceremony at Congress 590 in Warsaw with Polish Deputy Prime Minister Jacek Sasin, who also serves as Minister of State Assets. In July 2022, Last Energy announced an agreement with the Legnica Special Economic Zone (LSSE) in Legnica, in the Lower Silesian Voivodeship of southwest Poland. The agreement stated that Last Energy will develop 10 small modular reactors in the LSSE to fuel industrial activity in the region. 

Last Energy is also in talks with further potential energy partners, regulators and governments in Europe, Latin America and Asia.

References

External links

Official website

Nuclear technology companies of the United States
American companies established in 2020
Companies based in Washington, D.C.